Supervivientes 2019: Perdidos en Honduras, was the fourteenth season of the show Supervivientes and the eighteenth season of Survivor to air in Spain and it will be broadcast on Telecinco in spring 2019. Jorge Javier Vázquez will be the main host at the central studio in Madrid, with Lara Álvarez co-hosting from the island, Jordi Gonzalez hosting a side debate of the program and Carlos Sobera hosting a gala in Cuatro.

Cast
On Saturday 20, all the contestants were spotted at the airport traveling to Honduras. The full line-up is:

Nominations

Notes

: Piratas tribe has the privilege of being exempt from nominations.
: As the leaders of the teams, Albert and Oto were given the power to name a nominee.
: There was a tie between Dakota and Violeta, and the Piratas tribe broke it nominating Violeta.
: Loly was fake evicted and was sent to the Forgotten Pirate zone.
: As the leaders of the teams, Chelo and Violeta were given the power to name a nominee.
: Jonathan was fake evicted and was sent to the Forgotten Pirate zone.
: Contestants were split in three new groups decided randomly.
: As the leaders of the teams, Carlos and Colate were given the power to name a nominee.
: Violeta was evacuated due to medical reasons so she was exempt from nominations. However, on day 18 she came back to the competition and joined Piratas tribe.
: Aneth was fake evicted and was sent to the Forgotten Pirate zone.
: As the leaders of the teams, Colate and Lidia were given the power to name a nominee.
: There was a tie between Chelo and Oto and Lidia, as leader, broke it nominating Chelo.
: Contestants were split in two new groups decided by age and distributed in new locations.
: Carlos was fake evicted and was sent to the Forgotten Pirate zone.
: As the leaders of the teams, Colate and Fabio were given the power to name a nominee.
: Lidia was fake evicted and was sent to the Forgotten Pirate zone.
: As the leaders of the teams, Albert and Fabio were given the power to name a nominee.
: Chelo was fake evicted and was sent to the Forgotten Pirate zone.
: As the leaders of the teams, Isabel and Violeta were given the power to name a nominee.
: Mahi was fake evicted and was sent to the Forgotten Pirate zone.
: Omar was the leader and the rest of contestants were automatically nominated. Oto received the fewest votes to save and was fake evicted and sent to the Forgotten Pirate zone.
: As the leader of the team, Omar was given the power to name a nominee.
: Mónica was fake evicted and was sent to the Forgotten Pirate zone.
: As the leader of the team, Omar was given the power to name a nominee.
: Mónica was voted to return to the main tribe and for this reason she was exempt from nominations.
: Colate was fake evicted and was sent to the Forgotten Pirate zone.
: As the leader of the team, Fabio was given the power to name a nominee.
: Dakota was automatically nominated due to not following the rules.
: Dakota was fake evicted and was sent to the Forgotten Pirate zone.
: As the leader of the team, Albert was given the power to name a nominee.
: There was a tie between Isabel and Mahi and Albert, as leader, broke it nominating Isabel.
: As the leader of the team, Fabio was given the power to name a nominee.
: Albert won the last immunity challenge and went through the final vote. Fabio and Omar were nominated.

Tribes

Ratings

"Galas"

"Conexión Honduras"

"Tierra de Nadie"

References

External links
 

Survivor Spain seasons
2019 Spanish television seasons
Reality television articles with incorrect naming style